A Fazenda 2 was the second season of the Brazilian reality television series A Fazenda which premiered November 15, 2009 with the finale airing on February 10, 2010, on RecordTV.

This season was confirmed in July 2009, before the finale of the first season. Britto Junior and Chris Couto reprise their hosting stints for the show.

The winner was 33-year-old actress Karina Bacchi from São Manuel, São Paulo, who defeated actor André Segatti with 56% of the votes.

Production

Overview
The second season was broadcast during the South American summer, following the winter airing of the previous season. Contestants spent Christmas and New Year's Eve inside the Farm. Both events aired live.

Cast
There were fourteen celebrity contestants competing for the grand prize, which was R$1,000,000 without tax allowances. The season lasted 89 days, an increase of a half-week over the previous season.

Broadcasts
The main television coverage of A Fazenda 2 is screened in daily highlight programs that transmit Sundays to Fridays at 11:00 pm (UTC−3), Saturdays at 10:00 pm (UTC−3), with Sundays, Tuesdays and Wednesdays shows being broadcast live on Rede Record. The episodes summarize the events of the previous day in the Farm.

Contestants
The cast list was officially unveiled at the launch night on Sunday, November 15, 2009.

Biographical information according to Record official series site, plus footnoted additions.

(ages stated are at time of contest)

Future appearances
In 2011, Ana Paula Oliveira was contender to be a competitor on A Fazenda 4, but ultimately did not return.

In 2017, Sheila Mello appeared in Dancing Brasil 1, she finished in 5th place in the competition.

In 2017, Adriana Bombom returned to compete in A Fazenda 9, she finished in 15th place in the competition.

Voting history

Notes

References

External links
 Official Site 

A Fazenda
2009 Brazilian television seasons
2010 Brazilian television seasons